Brenda Grace Borgh (born October 27, 1960), later known by her married name Brenda Bartlett, is an American former competition swimmer.  Borgh represented the United States at the 1976 Summer Olympics in Montreal, Quebec.  She competed in the women's 400-meter freestyle, and finished sixth in the event final with a time of 4:17.43.

References

1960 births
Living people
American female freestyle swimmers
Olympic swimmers of the United States
People from Lower Merion Township, Pennsylvania
Swimmers at the 1976 Summer Olympics
21st-century American women